Headup GmbH (also known as Headup Games) is a German video game publisher based in Düren. The company was founded in January 2009 by Dieter Schoeller, who serves as its managing director. The company is best known for publishing the Bridge Constructor series of games developed by ClockStone.

History 
Headup Games was founded in January 2009 by Dieter Schoeller, who became its managing director. Operations were formally launched in Düren in April 2009, with Headup also employing executive producer Marcel Aldrup and executive PR & marketing manager Michael Zolna. The first game published by Headup was Twin Sector, an action-adventure games developed by Bremen-based studio DNS Development and released in September 2009. Subsequently, the company signed an agreement with NBG Multimedia that would allow NBG to distribute Headup's games in Germany, Austria and Switzerland. In October, Headup joined G.A.M.E., a German association for the video game industry. By January 2013, Headup employed six people, of which Zolna left the company in early April, being succeeded by Skander Essadi. By June 2014, Headup employed Schoeller, Aldrup and Aldrup's brother Mark as full-time employees, three trainees and two interns.

Accolades 
 – "Best Publisher" (2012, 2013, 2017)

References

External links 
 

German companies established in 2009
Companies based in North Rhine-Westphalia
Video game companies of Germany
Video game publishers
Video game companies established in 2009
Düren (district)
Privately held companies of Germany
2021 mergers and acquisitions